Nowa Wioska may refer to the following places in Poland:
Nowa Wioska, Lower Silesian Voivodeship (south-west Poland)
Nowa Wioska, Kuyavian-Pomeranian Voivodeship (north-central Poland)
Nowa Wioska, Greater Poland Voivodeship (west-central Poland)
Nowa Wioska, Będzin County in Silesian Voivodeship (south Poland)
Nowa Wioska, Racibórz County in Silesian Voivodeship (south Poland)
Nowa Wioska, Krosno Odrzańskie County in Lubusz Voivodeship (west Poland)
Nowa Wioska, Świebodzin County in Lubusz Voivodeship (west Poland)
Nowa Wioska, Pomeranian Voivodeship (north Poland)